Federal Hill is a historic home located at Fredericksburg, Virginia. It was built about 1794, and is a -story, brick and frame dwelling sheathed in weatherboard, with a two-story frame wing.  It has a gable roof with dormers. The front facade has a central pedimented pavilion and recessed fanlight door. The large ballroom and elaborate dining room are distinctive for their mixing of late colonial and Federal detailing. Federal Hill was probably built by Robert Brooke (1761–1800), governor of Virginia from 1794 to 1796.

It was listed on the National Register of Historic Places in 1975.

References

 Going to Battle for a Piece of History: The Maurers spent $4.7 million to restore a Civil War-scarred home in Fredericksburg, Va. The Wall Street Journal
 Federal Hill, Summerhouse, 510 Hanover Street, Fredericksburg, Fredericksburg, VA at the Historic American Buildings Survey (HABS)

Houses on the National Register of Historic Places in Virginia
Federal architecture in Virginia
Houses completed in 1794
Houses in Fredericksburg, Virginia
National Register of Historic Places in Fredericksburg, Virginia
Historic American Buildings Survey in Virginia
1794 establishments in Virginia